The 2014–15 season of the NOFV-Oberliga was the seventh season of the league at tier five (V) of the German football league system and the 25th overall. The league was split in a northern and southern division.

North
The 2014–15 season of the NOFV-Oberliga Nord saw four new clubs in the league, Hertha Zehlendorf, SV Waren and Germania Schöneiche, all promoted from the Verbandsligas while FSV Optik Rathenow had been relegated from the Regionalliga Nordost to the league.

Top goalscorers
The top goal scorers for the season:

South
The 2014–15 season of the NOFV-Oberliga Süd saw four new clubs in the league, RB Leipzig II, FC Eisenach and Askania Bernburg, all promoted from the Verbandsligas while 1. FC Lokomotive Leipzig had been relegated from the Regionalliga Nordost.

Top goalscorers
The top goal scorers for the season:

Promotion round to the Regionalliga
The two third-placed teams in the NOFV-Oberliga played each other for one more spot in the Regionalliga in the following season:

References

External links 
 NOFV-Oberliga Nord at Fupa.net 
 NOFV-Oberliga Süd at Fupa.net 

NOFV-Oberliga seasons
Nofv